Ballinacurra GAA is a Gaelic Athletic Association club located in the village of Ballinacurra, County Cork, Ireland. The club fields teams in both hurling and Gaelic football.

Honours

 East Cork Junior A Hurling Championship (3): 1927, 1928, 1942

External links
Ballinacurra GAA site

Gaelic games clubs in County Cork
Gaelic football clubs in County Cork
Hurling clubs in County Cork
1925 establishments in Ireland